Capital. A Critique of Political Economy. Volume III: The Process of Capitalist Production as a Whole, is the third volume of Capital: Critique of Political Economy. It was prepared by Friedrich Engels from notes left by Karl Marx and published in 1894.

Contents 
Volume III is in seven parts:
 The conversion of Surplus Value into Profit and the rate of Surplus Value into the rate of Profit
 Conversion of Profit into Average Profit
 The Law of the Tendency of the Rate of Profit to Fall
 Conversion of Commodity Capital and Money Capital into Commercial Capital and Money-Dealing Capital (Merchant's Capital)
 Division of Profit Into Interest and Profit of Enterprise, Interest Bearing Capital.
 Transformation of Surplus-Profit into Ground Rent.
 Revenues and Their Sources

The work is best known today for Part 3 which in summary says that as the organic fixed capital requirements of production rise as a result of advancements in production generally, the rate of profit tends to fall. This result which orthodox Marxists believe is a principal contradictory characteristic leading to an inevitable collapse of the capitalist order was held by Marx and Engels to—as a result of  various contradictions in the capitalist mode of production—result in crises whose resolution necessitates the emergence of an entirely new mode of production as the culmination of the same historical dialectic that led to the emergence of capitalism from prior forms.

Volume 3 is subtitled "The process of capitalist production as a whole" and is concerned primarily with the internal differentiation of the capitalist class. The first three parts are concerned with the division of surplus value amongst individual capitals, where it takes the form of profit. The following parts are concerned with merchants' capital, interest-bearing capital and landed capital. The last part draws the whole account together. The aim of the volume as a whole is to locate and describe the concrete forms which grow out of the movements of capital as a whole. Thus, the various forms of capital approach step by step the form which they assume on the surface of society in the action of different capitals on one another in competition and in the ordinary consciousness of the agents of production themselves (25) (Clarke).

See also 
 Das Kapital
 Capital, Volume I
 Capital, Volume II
 Differential and absolute ground rent
 Fictitious capital
 Prices of production
 Tendency of the rate of profit to fall
 Transformation problem

References

Further reading 
 Althusser, Louis; Balibar, Étienne (2009). Reading Capital. London: Verso.
 Althusser, Louis (1969) (October 1969). "How to Read Marx's Capital". Marxism Today. pp. 302–305. Originally appeared in French in L'Humanité on 21 April 1969.
 Bottomore, Tom, ed. (1998). A Dictionary of Marxist Thought. Oxford: Blackwell.
 Fine, Ben (2010). Marx's Capital. 5th ed. London: Pluto.
 Harvey, David (2010). A Companion to Marx's Capital. London: Verso.
 Harvey, David (2006). The Limits of Capital. London: Verso.
 Mandel, Ernest (1970). Marxist Economic Theory. New York: Monthly Review Press.
 Postone, Moishe (1993). Time, Labor, and Social Domination: A Reinterpretation of Marx's Critical Theory. Cambridge: Cambridge University Press.
 Shipside, Steve (2009). Karl Marx's Das Kapital: A Modern-day Interpretation of a True Classic. Oxford: Infinite Ideas. 
 Wheen, Francis (2006). Marx's Das Kapital--A Biography. New York: Atlantic Monthly Press. . .

External links 

 Marx, Karl; Engels, Friedrich, ed. (1894). "Capital Volume III". Full text at Marxists Internet Archive.
 Capital Volume III, complete book in PDF format by Progress Publishers

1894 non-fiction books
Books by Karl Marx
Unfinished books
1894 in economics
Books published posthumously